Nova Roma is a Roman reconstructionist organization.

Nova Roma (or "New Rome") may also refer to:
 Constantinople, also sometimes called Nova Roma
 Nova Roma, Goiás, a town in Brazil
 Nova Roma (2018 short film)
 Italian imperialism under Fascism, as Nova Roma

See also

Constantinople (disambiguation)
Roma (disambiguation)
Rome (disambiguation)
New Rome
New Rome (disambiguation)
Third Rome
Second Rome (disambiguation)
Rome II (disambiguation)